The Cuno strikes were nationwide strikes in Germany against the government of Chancellor Wilhelm Cuno in August 1923. The wave of strikes demanded, eventually with success, the resignation of the Cuno government, which occurred on 12 August 1923, after only nine months. The strikes also buoyed the hopes of the Communist International of an imminent revolution.

Background 

In January 1923, the Cuno government called for passive resistance of the Belgian and French occupation of the Ruhr region. At the same time, inflation in the Weimar Republic was racing out of control, result of the reparations payments or from the costs of the passive resistance, which made local authorities and companies boycott occupation forces while the government paid the wages of those administrations and compensated the coal and steel companies for their losses.

The expenses caused the collapse of the Reichsmark, which had already been inflated. During 1923, the mark fell from 21,000 to the US dollar at the beginning of the year to 6 trillion at the end.

For German society, the result was complete disaster, as people rushed out to buy things before their money lost its value, and people who had had savings saw them evaporate overnight. Considerable portions of the labour movement were as or even more opposed to the German government than to the French occupying forces. Their motto was "Beat Cuno and Poincaré at the Ruhr and at the Spree!"

Strikes
A labour dispute in the Berlin printing industry triggered a wildcat strike, instigated by the Communist Party of Germany (KPD). The Reich printing plant was also affected, causing the banknote presses to be stopped and, before long, a noticeable lack of paper money. Workers from power stations, construction and the Berliner Verkehrsbetriebe joined the strike. The wave of strikes demanded the resignation of the Cuno government.

Against the will of KPD party chairwoman Ruth Fischer, Otto Wels, the head of the Social Democratic Party (SPD) was able to forestall a general strike.

Pressured by the SPD, a conference of trade unions on 10 August 1923 rejected the call for a general strike, supported the left-wing Allgemeiner Deutscher Gewerkschaftsbund. The KPD, not accepting the defeat held a meeting of all the revolutionary works councils in Greater Berlin. It called a general strike to bring down the Cuno government but was hindered from publicizing the call widely because its Die Rote Fahne had been banned.

Nevertheless, the strikes, supported by some in the SPD, spread from Berlin to other cities and regions, such as Hamburg, Lusatia, Saxony Province as well as the states of Saxony and Thuringia. Factories were occupied by communist workers and factory managements sent fleeing. In the Ruhr Region, there was passive resistance rather than strikes. The response to the strike surpassed even the expectations of the leadership of the KPD.

Resignation of government
In total, three-and-a-half million workers went on strike indirectly forcing Cuno and his cabinet to resign on 11 August.

With the Cuno resignation on 11 August 1923, the strikes soon ended. Workers began returning to work. In addition to pressure from the strikes, on 10 August, the KPD faction in the Reichstag had moved to censure the Cuno government. The SPD, pushed by its base and looking to avert worse social unrest or possibly revolution, saw no other political alternative than to form a grand coalition. Rudolf Hilferding, in contrast to leftists aligned with Paul Levi, advocated such a move and urged Gustav Stresemann to take over the government, resolving the crisis within the framework of the parliamentary system and leaving the KPD unable to turn it into a revolutionary upheaval.

Near-revolution

Nonetheless, the Cuno strikes nurtured, in Moscow, the hope of a German revolution. There had been clashes with police in several cities and dozens of workers had been killed. Leon Trotsky and other Influential members of the Soviet Politburo and the Comintern believed Germany was ready for revolution, but Heinrich Brandler, the head of the KPD, felt the timing was premature. Despite Brandler's misgivings, on 23 August 1923, the Soviet Politburo adopted a plan for a "German October", but the attempted coup was cancelled at the last minute. Word of the cancellation did not reach Hamburg in time (or was possibly ignored by the local KPD leadership) and the local insurrection took place, as planned.

References

Sources 
 Heinrich August Winkler: Germany: The Long Road West. Vol. 1: 1789-1933. Oxford University Press, Oxford (2006) 

Politics of the Weimar Republic
1923 in Germany
Labor history
General strikes in Europe
Communism in Germany
Labour disputes in Germany
1923 labor disputes and strikes